María Luisa de la Riva y Callol-Muñoz (1865−1926)  was a Spanish painter.

Biography
Riva y Callol de Muñoz was born on 4 April 1865 in Zaragoza, Spain. She was married to fellow painter Domingo Muñoz.

She exhibited regularly at the Exposiciones Nacionales de Bellas Artes where she won medals in 1897, 1901, 1887, and 1895. Riva y Callol de Muñoz  exhibited her work at the Woman's Building at the 1893 World's Columbian Exposition in Chicago, Illinois. and she also exhibited at the Exposition Universelle in 1889.

Riva y Callol de Muñoz was a member of the Union of Women Painters and Sculptors of Vienna as well as the Society of Artists of Berlin and the Society of Artists of Vienna.

She died in Madrid, Spain on 22 September 1926. Her paintings are in the Museo del Prado's collection.

Gallery

References

1865 births
1926 deaths
19th-century Spanish women artists
20th-century Spanish women artists
19th-century Spanish painters
20th-century Spanish painters